Jaromír Šindel (born November 30, 1959 in Ostrava, Czechoslovakia) is a former ice hockey player who played for the Czechoslovak national team. He won a silver medal at the 1984 Winter Olympics. His son Jakub Šindel is also an international in the sport.

References

External links

1959 births
Living people
Czech ice hockey goaltenders
Czechoslovak ice hockey goaltenders
Ice hockey players at the 1984 Winter Olympics
Ice hockey players at the 1988 Winter Olympics
Olympic ice hockey players of Czechoslovakia
Olympic medalists in ice hockey
Olympic silver medalists for Czechoslovakia
Sportspeople from Ostrava
Medalists at the 1984 Winter Olympics
HC Vítkovice players
HC Dukla Jihlava players
HC Sparta Praha players
Czechoslovak expatriate sportspeople in Finland
Czechoslovak expatriate ice hockey people
Czech expatriate ice hockey players in Finland